Kanti Highway is a  feeder road under construction in Bagmati Province, Nepal, that connects Lalitpur Metropolitan City to Hetauda Sub-Metropolitan City.

The construction on the road started in 1954 by King Mahendra, and the road was initially named Tikabhairab-Hetauda Road. However, in 1962, it was named Kanti Highway after the Queen Kanti of Nepal.

In the late 1990s, the Government of Nepal recognised this road as an alternative highway of Tribhuvan Highway (H02) that connects Kathmandu to Birgunj on the Nepal-India border.

References 

Highways in Nepal
1954 establishments in Nepal